Lukonin is a Russian surname; its feminine counterpart is Lukonina. Notable people with the surname include:
Mikhail Lukonin (1918–1976), Soviet Russian poet
Nicolai Lukonin ( 1980s), Soviet Union Minister of Atomic Energy from 1986 to 1989
Saratovite Sergey Lukonin, central character in 1942 Soviet drama film Lad from Our Town
Vladimir G. Lukonin (1932–1984), Russian archaeologist and historian
Yana Lukonina
Anna Antonenko-Lukonina